Rhoda Boyd was born in rural Cumberland County, Pennsylvania in 1748 to John Boyd, immigrant from Ulster and Nancy Urie, immigrant from Scotland.  Rhoda and her siblings were captured by Delaware Indians on 10 February 1756.  They killed her mother and youngest brother during the attack.

Fates of family members
 Nancy (Urie) Boyd (mother),  killed after the attack
 infant, possibly George Boyd,  killed in the attack
 John Boyd Sr. (father), not present at the attack.  He remarried, and died in 1788.
 William Boyd, oldest son, with his father and not present for the raid. He was a blacksmith in Perry County, Pennsylvania.
 John Boyd, Jr., captured and adopted by the Delaware; returned from the Delaware in later years to visit relatives, but continued to live as an Indian. 
 David Boyd  returned to his father by his Indian foster father, who originally captured him.
 Sarah (Sallie) Boyd, taken captive and lived with the Delaware for several years, was returned to Fort Pitt, 1764

Later life
Taken captive at age eight, Rhoda lived with the Delaware for eight years, from the age of eight to sixteen, by which time she was assimilated to the band.  Liberated by Colonel Henry Bouquet at the forks of the Muskingum River, she and Elizabeth Studebaker, another English colonist adopted by the Delaware, escaped from his custody on their way to Fort Pitt in Pittsburgh, and returned to the Delaware.  United States historians such as Laurel Thatcher Ulrich incorrectly assumed that the younger children were when taken captive, the more likely they were to become assimilated to the tribe.  Girls and young women forced into tribal marriages often wanted to reunite with their birth families rather than adjust to the culture of their new communities.  This was the case with Eunice Williams, the daughter of John Williams, the minister of Deerfield, Massachusetts; after being taken to Canada and adopted by the Mohawk, she married a Mohawk husband at age 16 and never returned full-time to her New England family.

Rhoda Boyd was ransomed in Detroit in 1764 and taken back to the British colonists.
 Bouquet took her to Carlisle, Pennsylvania in 1764.  There she married American Revolutionary War soldier Thomas Robert Smiley. They had children together, and the family later moved to Somerset, Pennsylvania.  They eventually moved to Tuscarawas County, Ohio, where there was a settlement of Christianized Delaware.  Rhoda Boyd Smiley died there in 1823.

References

1823 deaths
1748 births
History of Pittsburgh
Captives of Native Americans
People from Perry County, Pennsylvania
People from Tuscarawas County, Ohio
History of Detroit
People from Cumberland County, Pennsylvania
People of colonial Pennsylvania
American people of Scottish descent